Pointing the Finger is a studio album by the rock artist Kevin Coyne which was released in 1981.

The album was described by Mark Cordery of the New Musical Express:
"The themes of this LP are generally the hoary old ones of 'Alienation'; the difficulty (and in many cases the tacitly accepted impossibility) of communication, and the insubstantiality and hence inadequacy of 'Religion'. Dealt with here in the 'soul-baring' 60's singer-songwriter style; mostly stripped of imagery, and completely of metaphor, it's a bleak but uncompellng vision. Not to say a narrow one."

The title track dates from 1977 and Coyne's musical "England, England".

Track listing
 "There She Goes" - 5.02
 "As I Recall" - 4.27
 "Children of the Deaf" - 1.06
 "One Little Moment" - 6.30
 "Let Love Reside" - 3.28
 "Sleeping-Waking" - 4.17
 "Pointing the Finger" - 4.07
 "You Can't Do That" - 3.58
 "Song of the Womb" - 2.36
 "Old Lady" - 4.00

Personnel
 Kevin Coyne - vocals, guitar
 Brian Godding - electric guitars
 Dave Sheen - drums, backing vocals on "Old Lady"
 Steve Lamb - bass guitar
 Steve Bull - keyboards, synthesizer
Technical
 Producers: Kevin Coyne and Brian Godding with G.L.S. (Godding, Lamb, Sheen) at Alvic Studios, West Kensington
 Engineer: Mike Gregovich
 Cover artwork: Kevin Coyne

1981 albums
Kevin Coyne albums
Cherry Red Records albums